Pholidophorus (from  , 'horny scale' and  , 'to bear') is an extinct genus of stem-teleost fish. Numerous species were assigned to this genus in the past, but only the type species Pholidophorus latiusculus, from the Late Triassic of Europe, is considered to be a valid member of the genus today.

Taxonomy
The genus Pholidophorus for a long time served as a wastebasket taxon containing various unrelated species of basal stem-teleosts. Over the years, many of these have been moved to separate genera. The Late Jurassic nominal species "Pholidophorus" purbeckensis was renamed Ichthyokentema by Arthur Woodward in 1941. Likewise, the Early Jurassic form "Pholidophorus" bechei was renamed Dorsetichthys and moved to its own family, Dorsetichthyidae, by Arratia (2013). The nominal species "Pholidophorus" friedeni Delsate, 1999 and "Pholidophorus" gervasuttii Zambelli, 1980 were renamed Luxembourgichthys and Lombardichthys by Taverne and Steurbaut (2017) and Arratia (2017) respectively.

Description
Like them, however, it had a single dorsal fin, a symmetrical tail, and an anal fin placed towards the rear of the body. It had large eyes and was probably a fast-swimming predator, hunting planktonic crustaceans and smaller fish.

A very early teleost, Pholidophorus had many primitive characteristics such as ganoid scales and a spine that was partially composed of cartilage, rather than bone.

References

Pholidophoridae
Monotypic ray-finned fish genera
Prehistoric ray-finned fish genera
Norian genera
Triassic bony fish
Late Triassic fish of Europe
Fossil taxa described in 1832
Taxa named by Louis Agassiz